Hibbertia ancistrophylla is a species of flowering plant in the family Dilleniaceae and is endemic to the south-west of Western Australia. It is a shrub with sessile, linear leaves and bright yellow flowers arranged singly in leaf axils with eight to eleven stamens fused at their bases on one side of the carpels.

Description
There are eight to eleven stamens, fused at the base and on one side of the two carpels that each contain four ovules. Flowering occurs from June to October.

Taxonomy
Hibbertia ancistrophylla was first formally described in 2002 by Judith R. Wheeler in the journal Nuytsia from specimens she collected near Mollerin in 1989. The specific epithet (ancistrophylla) means "fish-hook leaf", referring to the hooked leaf tip.

Distribution and habitat
This species occurs between Wubin, Paynes Find, Hyden and Coolgardie in the Avon Wheatbelt, Coolgardie, Mallee and Murchison biogeographic regions in the south-west of Western Australia, growing in open shrubland and heath.

Conservation status
Hibbertia ancistrophylla is classified as "not threatened" by the Western Australian Government Department of Parks and Wildlife

See also
List of Hibbertia species

References

ancistrophylla
Flora of Western Australia
Plants described in 2002